Baljit Singh (born 18 May 1981), was an Indian cricketer. He was a right-handed batsman and leg-break bowler who played for Odisha. He was born in Sambalpur.

Singh played for the Under-16, Under-19, and Under-22 teams between 1996 and 2000, and made a single first-class appearance for the side, during the 1996–97 season, against Maharashtra. From the tailend, he scored a single run in the only innings in which he batted.

Singh took three wickets in the match, including that of Hrishikesh Kanitkar.

External links
Baljit Singh at Cricket Archive 

1981 births
Living people
Indian cricketers
Odisha cricketers
People from Sambalpur
Cricketers from Odisha